Statue of Robert Baden-Powell may refer to:
Statue of Robert Baden-Powell, London, 1960 granite work by Don Potter 
 Statue of Robert Baden-Powell, Poole, 2000 bronze by David Annand